Melville Haysom (1900-1967) was an Australian artist, sculptor, instructor and musician. He specialised in portrait, coastal and animal paintings and alternated between impressionist and abstract styles. His work is held in galleries in Canberra, Sydney and Brisbane.

Early life 
Melville Roy George Haysom was born in Melbourne, Victoria on August 17, 1900. His parents, William and Christina Haysom encouraged his studies of art and music. He studied art at the National Gallery School in Melbourne in the style of the Heidelberg School but was also influenced by the abstract styles then coming out of Europe. He became President of the Victorian Art Society in 1923.

Haysom moved to Queensland in 1929. He wrote art critiques for newspapers, worked as a musician in the orchestra of the Regent Theatre, as well as pursuing his painting career. He received the Godfrey Rivers Bequest Award in 1935 for his portrait of his wife. He was commissioned to prepare a portrait of Dr James Mayne in 1936. Murals by Haysom are on the walls of QUT Kelvin Grove and Tattersalls Club in Brisbane.

Military service 
Haysom volunteered in the Australian Army during World War II. Following this service he taught art at the Brisbane Central Technical College (now QUT), providing instruction to many ex-servicemen who took advantage of the scholarships on offer after the war. He and his wife encouraged the art community in Brisbane which regularly met at their home Merri Merri farm, in the foothills of Mt Coot-tha at Chapel Hill. He was a Fellow of the Australian Artists Society and a Life Member of the Royal Queensland Art Society, in addition to being its President from 1952-1955. Haysom was also involved in the Scouting movement of Brisbane.

Personal life 
Haysom married Yvonne Denis in Melbourne in 1925. He died in Brisbane on December 25, 1967 and was survived by his wife, Yvonne and their son, Noel. Selected papers relating to his career are held by the University of Queensland Fryer Library and the State Library of Queensland. An annual memorial scholarship was awarded in his name by the Queensland Art Gallery until Yvonne's death in 2016.

His art is found in the Queensland Art Gallery, National Gallery of Australia, National Gallery of New South Wales and University of Queensland Darnell Collection, as well as held privately. Two retrospectives of his work have been held since his death, in 1971 and at the Ipswich City Council Art Gallery in 1987, curated by Stephen Rainbird.

References 

Australian sculptors
20th-century Australian sculptors
Australian painters
1900 births
1967 deaths
Artists from Melbourne
National Gallery of Victoria Art School alumni
Australian Army personnel of World War II
Military personnel from Melbourne
Academic staff of Queensland University of Technology